Geomitra is a genus of air-breathing land snails, terrestrial pulmonate gastropod mollusks in the family Geomitridae.

Species
Species within the genus Geomitra include:
 Geomitra delphinuloides (R.T. Lowe, 1860)
 Geomitra grabhami (Wollaston, 1878)
 Geomitra moniziana (Paiva, 1867) - Madeiran land snail
 Geomitra tiarella (Webb & Berthelot, 1833)
 Geomitra coronula (R.T. Lowe, 1852)
 Geomitra watsoni (J.Y. Johnson, 1897)

synonyms:
 Geomitra coronata (Deshayes, 1850) is a synonym for Serratorotula coronata (Deshayes, 1850)

References

 
Geomitridae
Taxonomy articles created by Polbot